Cushuropata (possibly from local Quechua kushuru an edible kind of seaweed, pata step, bank of a river) is a mountain in the Rawra mountain range in the Andes of Peru whose summit reaches about  above sea level. It is located in the boundary between the regions of  Lima and Pasco. Cushuropata lies southeast of Chuspe.

References

Mountains of Peru
Mountains of Lima Region
Mountains of Pasco Region